Hedgebrook is a rural retreat for women writers on Whidbey Island, Washington, founded in 1988. Hedgebrook's artist-in-residence program accepts up to 80 writers each year, who spend two to four weeks in residence working on their diverse writing projects. Each writer stays in her own hand-crafted cottage. Room and board are provided at no cost to the writers-in-residence. The retreat is a working farm, offering organic produce for the writers, and communal dinners each night prepared by in-house chefs.

Hedgebrook's global community of alumnae, more than 2,000 writers from all over the world, include celebrated author Gloria Steinem, poets Naomi Shihab Nye, Suheir Hammad, playwrights Dael Orlandersmith, Ellen McLaughlin, and Eve Ensler, novelists Nassim Assefi, Bernardine Evaristo, Sarah Ladipo Manyika, Mary Gordon, Ruth Ozeki, Elizabeth George, and Sarah Waters, memoirists Honor Moore and Carolyn Forché, non-fiction writers Pramila Jayapal and Holly Morris, and solo performer Sarah Jones.

Hedgebrook's Radical Craft Classes offer women writers the unique opportunity to study with renowned women writers such as Jane Hamilton, Theresa Rebeck, Karen Joy Fowler, Victoria Redel, Claire Dederer and Robin Swicord. The week-long writing workshops, offered in a variety of genres (fiction, memoir, playwriting, screenwriting, poetry), focus on different aspects of the writer's craft and process.

The annual Hedgebrook Women Playwrights Festival (HWPF) celebrates the work of women writing for the theatre. Since the festival’s inauguration in 1998, HWPF has supported the work of an impressive array of women playwrights and served an important role in the development of new plays by women. The festival begins with a "pre-retreat" weekend, in which the playwrights have the opportunity to get to know one another, hear each other’s plays read aloud, and share responses with an intimate group of theatre professionals in a relaxed, convivial atmosphere. This is followed by a two-week retreat at Hedgebrook, where each playwright has her own private cottage, a dramaturg on-call, and the opportunity to work in Hedgebrook’s unique combination of solitude and community. The retreat is capped off with public presentations of excerpts from each play.

Participation in the Hedgebrook Women Playwrights Festival is by invitation in collaboration with partner theatres from around the country. In recognition of the fact that fewer than 20% of the plays produced each year on US stages are by women, Hedgebrook is partnering with theatres who show their commitment to women playwrights through commissions, development and production opportunities. In this way, Hedgebrook forges opportunities for women playwrights to deepen their relationships with theatres and is becoming a major pipeline for plays by women to move from creation to development and production. Current partners include: Denver Theatre Center, Oregon Shakespeare Festival, Seattle's ACT Theatre, Chicago's Goodman Theatre and Center Theatre Group, Los Angeles.

HWPF plays have gone on to productions around the country. Alumnae include:
Lynn Nottage (2000), recipient of the 2009 Pulitzer Prize for drama for Ruined
Theresa Rebeck (2001), prolific playwright, screenwriter, and novelist
Caridad Svich (2002, 2007), recipient of the 2012 OBIE Award for Lifetime Achievement, recipient of the 2011 American Theatre Critics Association Primus Prize
Sarah Ruhl (2003), MacArthur Fellow and author of The Clean House 
Eisa Davis (2004), recipient of the 2012 Alpert Award in the Arts for Theatre
Quiara Alegría Hudes (2006), recipient of the 2012 Pulitzer Prize for drama for Water by the Spoonful and author of the book for the Tony Award-winning Broadway musical In the Heights
Danai Gurira (2008, 2010), author of Eclipsed, Obie Award-winning writer and recipient of the Whiting Writers' Award; stage and film actress including Michonne in The Walking Dead (AMC).
Kimber Lee (2012), 2013 PoNY Fellow

References

External links 
  - Official site of Hedgebrook

Artist colonies
Organizations for women writers

  - Chuck Dougherty, now at Form Studio, Vancouver, WA.  1988 Designer of the Cottages and Renovations at Hedgebrook Farm